St. Monica Academy is a private, independent Roman Catholic high school in Montrose, California.  It is operated independently of the Roman Catholic Archdiocese of Los Angeles.

Background
St. Monica Academy, a classical Catholic school in the Los Angeles area for grades 1-12, was established in 2001 by lay parents. While not under the direct authority of the Los Angeles Archdiocese, the academy does have Archdiocesan approval similar to other private, Catholic schools in the area. St. Monica Academy is accredited by WASC and WCEA.

In 2012, St. Monica Academy's high school was named to the Cardinal Newman Society's Catholic High School Honor Roll, making it one of the Top 50 Catholic high schools in the United States. In 2013, it achieved the highest mean SAT scores of any Catholic high school in the Los Angeles Archdiocese, on all three sections of the SAT. In 2014, it was recognized by the Cardinal Newman Society as a national School of Excellence. In 2018, it was again awarded a place in said Society's Catholic Education Honor Roll.

From 2001 until 2015, St. Monica Academy was the tenant of Neighborhood Unitarian Church in Pasadena, CA. Following the 2015 academic year, the school relocated to the campus of the former parochial school at Holy Redeemer Catholic Church in Montrose, CA.

Notes and references

External links
 School Website
 School Facebook Page

Roman Catholic secondary schools in Los Angeles County, California
High schools in Los Angeles County, California
Educational institutions established in 2001
Catholic secondary schools in California
2001 establishments in California